Michael L. Douglas is a former justice of the Supreme Court of Nevada. He was appointed in 2004, and his term ended in 2019. When Douglas was appointed, he became the first African-American Supreme Court Justice in the State of Nevada.

Douglas graduated from California State College, Long Beach in 1971 and University of California, Hastings College of the Law in 1974.

Douglas retired in January 2019.

See also
List of African-American jurists

References

|-

1944 births
21st-century American judges
African-American judges
California State University, Long Beach alumni
Lawyers from Los Angeles
Living people
Nevada state court judges
Justices of the Nevada Supreme Court
Place of birth missing (living people)
University of California, Hastings College of the Law alumni
Chief Justices of the Nevada Supreme Court
21st-century African-American people
20th-century African-American people